Jolanta Lothe (19 April 1942 – 1 April 2022) was a Polish actress. She appeared in more than twenty-five films since 1965.

Biography
Jolanta, the daughter of Tadeusz Lothe (1903–1943) and actress Wanda Stanisławska-Lothe (1908–1985), graduated from the National Higher School of Theatre in Warsaw in 1966. After she worked as an actress of Warsaw stages: Syrena Theater (1966–1967), Classic Theater (1968–1972), Studio Theater (1972–1976), and National Theatre (1976–1982). From 1989, together with her second husband Piotr Lachmann, she ran an experimental "Videoteatr Poza" in Warsaw. Her first husband was playwright and theater director Helmut Kajzar, who died in 1982.

Selected filmography

References

External links
 

1942 births
2022 deaths
Polish film actresses
Polish stage actresses
Polish television actresses
Polish people of German descent
Actresses from Vilnius
20th-century Polish actresses
Aleksander Zelwerowicz National Academy of Dramatic Art in Warsaw alumni
Recipients of the Bronze Medal for Merit to Culture – Gloria Artis
Recipients of the Silver Medal for Merit to Culture – Gloria Artis